The East Yorkshire Borough of Beverley was a local government district and borough of Humberside, England, from 1974 to 1996.

It was formed on 1 April 1974, by the merger of the previous borough of Beverley, with Beverley Rural District and Haltemprice Urban District.  Initially named Beverley, the name was formally changed by the council to East Yorkshire Borough of Beverley in 1981.

On 1 April 1996, Humberside was abolished along with the borough, and the area become part of a unitary East Riding of Yorkshire.

References

Populated places established in 1974
Populated places disestablished in 1996
Former non-metropolitan districts of Humberside
Beverley
Former boroughs in England